This is a list of species in the genus Pholiotina. Since Pholiotina under the current definition is polyphyletic, some of the species listed below will likely be moved to other genera. Some of these species are also likely to be junior synonyms of other species.

Pholiotina aeruginosa
Pholiotina alba
Pholiota alnicola
Pholiotina altaica
Pholiotina altoindina
Pholiotina aporos
Pholiotina arnoldsii
Pholiotina arrhenii
Pholiota astragalina
Pholiotina atrocyanea
Pholiotina australis
Pholiotina austrofilaris
Pholiotina blattaria
Pholiotina brunnea
Pholiotina caricicola
Pholiotina coprophila
Pholiotina cyanopus
Pholiotina dasypus
Pholiotina ealaensis
Pholiotina exannulata
Pholiotina filipes
Pholiotina fimicola
Pholiotina flexipes
Pholiotina flava
Pholiotina glutinosa
Pholiotina gracilenta
Pholiota gummosa
Pholiotina hadrocystis
Pholiota lenta
Pholiota lubrica
Pholiotina indica
Pholiotina intermedia
Pholiotina keniensis
Pholiotina mairei
Pholiotina maireiaffinis
Pholiotina microspora
Pholiotina nemoralis
Pholiotina novae-zelandiae
Pholiotina parvula
Pholiotina peronata
Pholiotina pilosa
Pholiotina pinguis
Pholiotina plumbeitincta
Pholiotina procera
Pholiotina pygmaeoaffinis
Pholiotina resinosocystidiata
Pholiotina rugosa
Pholiotina ruiz-lealii
Pholiotina septentrionalis
Pholiotina smithii
Pholiota spumosa
Pholiotina stercoraria
Pholiotina striipes
Pholiotina subverrucispora
Pholiotina sulcata
Pholiotina teneroides
Pholiotina tucumana
Pholiotina utricystidiata
Pholiotina velata
Pholiotina verrucispora
Pholiotina vestita
Pholiotina vexans

References

Pholiotina